Tuaca is an Italian naturally flavored brandy liqueur. Tuaca is a sweet  golden brown blend of brandy, citrus essences, vanilla, and other secret spices.  It is bottled at 35% ABV (70 proof).

Tuaca's mild, sweet flavor makes it popular as a cordial, mixed by some with coffee, both hot and iced.

History
The brand claims the recipe dates back to the Renaissance period, a not uncommon (but invariably poorly supported) claim.  See Bénédictine.  A legend it promotes claims that it was created in the 15th century for Lorenzo the Magnificent and rediscovered by brothers-in-law Gaetano Tuoni and Giorgio Canepa in 1938. The liquor was first created as Brandy Milk, produced with milk, brandy and vanilla. Later on, milk was dropped from the recipe, and the name was changed to Tuoca.

In the 1960s, Mario di Grazia, an Italian  and the owner of a chain of liquor stores in San Francisco, began selling the liqueur in the United States. To make pronunciation in English easier the name was changed again to Tuaca.  It is popular in Brighton and Hove, UK. 

Brown-Forman of Louisville, Kentucky acquired the Tuaca brand in 2002, then sold it to Sazerac Company in 2016. 

March 31, 2010, marked the closure of Livorno's historic Tuaca plant.

See also
 Bomb shot
 List of cocktails
 Shooter (drink)

References

External links
 

Italian liqueurs
Sazerac Company brands
Vanilla liqueurs